Ivan, Son of the White Devil (also known just as Ivan) is a 1953 	Italian adventure film written and directed by Guido Brignone and starring Paul Campbell and  Nadia Gray. It grossed 345 million lire at the Italian box office.

Plot

Cast 
 
Paul Campbell as  Ivan
Nadia Gray as  Princess Alina
Arnoldo Foà as Emir Abdul
Nando Bruno as  Boris
 Erica Vaal Pahlen as  Myriam
 Alda Mangini as  Dunia
Alberto Sorrentino  as Stepan
Sandro Ruffini
Mario Feliciani
 Nerio Bernardi
Guido Celano 
 Ugo Sasso
 Agostino Salvietti
 Pietro Tordi

References

External links

1953 films
Italian historical adventure films
1950s historical adventure films
Films directed by Guido Brignone
Films with screenplays by Age & Scarpelli
Films set in the 19th century
Films set in Russia
1950s Italian-language films
1950s Italian films